Thomas Rivera Schatz (born June 10, 1966) is a Puerto Rican politician, legal advisor, attorney, and former prosecutor, who was the fourteenth and sixteenth President of the Senate of Puerto Rico. He is affiliated with New Progressive Party of Puerto Rico (abbr. PNP in Spanish) and the mainland Republican Party. On July 22, 2019, Rivera Schatz announced that he will take over as acting chair of the PNP following the resignation of Ricardo Rosselló due to the Telegramgate scandal.

Early life and studies
Rivera Schatz was born on June 10, 1966, in the Bronx Borough of New York City. He is the son of José A. "Nía" Rivera, a past mayor of Trujillo Alto, and Christina Schatz, a German woman. While in college, he worked full-time at the City of San Juan Public Works Department. He attended the Interamerican University of Puerto Rico School of Law, where he graduated in 1992. A year later, he passed the bar exam required to practice law in Puerto Rico.

Rivera Schatz started his legal career as a legal advisor in the Senate and House of Representatives of Puerto Rico. In 1996, Governor Pedro Rosselló appointed him as a prosecutor at the Puerto Rico Department of Justice. After finishing his service as a prosecutor, he returned to private practice, handling both criminal and civil cases.

Political career

Electoral Commissioner and Secretary General: 2000-2007
In 2000, Rivera Schatz was named Electoral Commissioner for the pro-statehood New Progressive Party (PNP).

Two years later, party president Pedro Rosselló named Rivera Schatz as secretary general of the PNP in addition to his current position as electoral commissioner. He served both positions simultaneously until August 1, 2007, when he decided to run for senator.

Senator: 2008-present
Rivera Schatz ran for senator at the PNP primaries where he won a slot in the ballot, receiving the second-most votes. In the 2008 general elections, Rivera Schatz was elected senator. His fellow senators then elected him to be the 14th president of Puerto Rico's Senate. As such, he selected the following persons for his team:
 Senator Margarita Nolasco as Senate President Pro tempore
 Senator Larry Seilhamer as majority leader
 Senator Melinda Romero as Majority Whip
 Roberto "Junior" Maldonado as chief administrative officer of the Senate.
 Senate Secretary Manuel A. Torres was nominated by Rivera Schatz and reelected to a second term, becoming the first Senate secretary to serve under two different Senate Presidents
 Incumbent Superintendent of the Capitol, Eliezer Velázquez, was nominated by Rivera Schatz and ratified by House Speaker Jennifer González for a second term, a first for a superintendent.

Rivera Schatz was sworn into his post on January 12, 2009.

Thomas Rivera Schatz was reelected in 2012 and elected for the third time as a member of the Senate majority in the 2016 election with 10.33% of the "at large" votes, placing him in second place after independent senatorial candidate Dr. José Vargas Vidot and followed by Juan Dalmau of the Puerto Rico Independence Party (PIP). Rivera Schatz was elected to a second term as President of the Senate of Puerto Rico starting January 2017.  He holds two records, first as the only reelected Senate President during the past 28 years and the only Senate President ever elected as such to non-consecutive terms.

PNP President
On July 22, 2019, Rivera Schatz announced he would succeed Puerto Rican Governor Ricardo Rosselló as head of the New Progressive Party of Puerto Rico (PNP). Rosselló announced his intention to resign due to the ongoing controversy surrounding Telegramgate.

Personal life
Rivera Schatz and his father are avid collectors of antique cars.

References

External links
 Biography at the official website of the Senate of Puerto Rico

|-

|-

|-

1966 births
20th-century Puerto Rican lawyers
20th-century Puerto Rican politicians
21st-century Puerto Rican lawyers
21st-century Puerto Rican politicians
Interamerican University of Puerto Rico alumni
Members of the Senate of Puerto Rico
Living people
New Progressive Party (Puerto Rico) politicians
Politicians from the Bronx
Presidents of the New Progressive Party (Puerto Rico)
Presidents of the Senate of Puerto Rico
Puerto Rican people of German descent
Puerto Rican Roman Catholics
Republican Party (Puerto Rico) politicians